Sofya Yevgenyevna Lansere (born 29 September 2000) is a Russian tennis player.

Shre has a career-high singles ranking of world No. 243, achieved on 2 March 2020. On 13 February 2023, she peaked at No. 159 in the WTA doubles rankings.

Lansere made her WTA Tour main-draw debut at the 2018 Moscow River Cup in the doubles tournament, partnering with Elena Rybakina.

ITF Circuit finals

Singles: 4 (2 titles, 2 runner–ups)

Doubles: 16 (7 titles, 9 runner–ups)

References

External links
 
 

2000 births
Living people
Russian female tennis players
Tennis players from Moscow
Russian people of French descent
21st-century Russian women